Nevromus is a genus in the dobsonfly or Corydalidae family of Megalopteran insects. They are found in Asia and are among the few Asian Corydalines that are found on islands including Borneo, Java and Sumatra.

References

External links
 
 

Megaloptera
Corydalidae
Taxa named by Jules Pierre Rambur
Invertebrates of Southeast Asia
Invertebrates of Borneo
Arthropods of Indonesia